Brookesia ebenaui (northern leaf chameleon or Ebenau's leaf chameleon) is a chameleon, a lizard in the family Chamaeleonidae. The species, which is endemic to Madagascar,  can rapidly change color among various earth hues.

Etymology
The specific name, ebenaui, is in honor of German zoologist Karl Ebenau.

Geographic range
B. ebenaui is found in extreme northern Madagascar.

Habitat

Reproduction
B. ebenaui is oviparous.

References

Further reading
Boettger O (1880). "Diagnoses reptilium et batrachiorum novorum a Carolo Ebenau in insula Nossi-Bé Madagascariensis lectorum ". Zoologischer Anzeiger 3: 279–283. (Chamaeleo ebenaui, new species, p. 280). (in Latin).
Boulenger GA (1887). Catalogue of the Lizards in the British Museum (Natural History). Second Edition. Volume III ... Chamæleontidæ. London: Trustees of the British Museum (Natural History). (Taylor and Francis, printers). xii + 575 pp. + Plates I-XL. (Brookesia ebenaui, new combination, p. 475)
Glaw F, Vences M (1994). A Fieldguide to the Amphibians and Reptiles of Madagascar, Second Edition. Cologne, Germany: Vences & Glaw Verlag /Serpents Tale. 480 pp. .
Henkel F-W, Schmidt W (2000). Amphibians and Reptiles of Madagascar and the Mascarene, Seychelles, and Comoro Islands. Malabar, Florida: Krieger Publishing Company. vii + 316 pp. .
Ramanantsoa GA (1980). "Description de deux nouvelles espèces de Brookesia (Reptilia, Squamata, Chameleonidae): B. legendre et B. bonsi". Bulletin du Muséum national d'Histoire naturelle, Paris 4 (1): 685–693. (Brookesia legendrei, new species). (in French).

Photolinks
Wildherps.com

ebenaui
Endemic fauna of Madagascar
Reptiles of Madagascar
Vulnerable animals
Vulnerable biota of Africa
Reptiles described in 1880
Taxa named by Oskar Boettger